Bridging may refer to:

Construction
 Building of bridges across a gap
 Cross bracing used between joists to stabilize them

Electronics and computing
 In electronics, using a low source impedance to drive a large load impedance for maximum voltage transfer, called impedance bridging
 In electronics, a method of connecting a load to two amplifiers to increase available voltage, called a bridged amplifier
 Bridging (networking), a packet forwarding technique used in computer networks
 Bridging (programming), a system that allows different programming languages to share common resources
 Communication protocol bridge, 
 In electronic assembly, a solder bridge is an (unintended) electrical connection between two conductors by means of a small blob of solder. PCB's use solder masks to prevent this from happening.

Transport
 The procedure by which oil products such as diesel or petrol are moved ("bridged") by road tanker from one oil depot to another.
 Using a transport ship to move infantry or armor across bodies of water in one turn in the board game Axis and Allies.

Medicine
 The binding of an antigen molecule by two IgE antibodies bound to a mast cell or basophil granulocyte, leading to degranulation.
 Bridging vein

Education
 The bridging between international training and a country's requisites through a bridge program (higher education)
 The bridging between secondary and post-secondary studies at a university, such as the Academic Bridging Program at Woodsworth College, Toronto.

Sport
 Bridge (exercise)
 In grappling, the technique of pushing the hips upwards to offbalance a top opponent, for instance by trying to escape the mount.
 Supporting the cue stick near its tip for a shot in billiards either by hand or sometimes with the help of a mechanical bridge.
 A climbing technique, used for climbing corners.
 In basketball, the act of trying to box out an airborne opponent (while shooting or rebounding, for example), getting under the opponents legs, and causing them to become unbalanced & topple to the ground.
 In bench pressing, the technique of pushing the hips upward to gain a mechanical advantage allowing for favorable angling and synergy among the pectorals, deltoids, and triceps to press the weight upward while decreasing the distance the bar must travel to complete the lift.

Other uses
 A technique used in animal training
 Bridged molecules (chemistry)
 A compaction of material at the base of a storage silo which can interfere with the flow of the silo contents
 In Unitarian Universalist communities, the passing from one age range and its group(s), on into another age range and the group(s) for those occupying it
 In Girl Scouts of the USA, the move from one age grouping to another (Brownies to Juniors to Cadettes to Seniors) and completion of specific requirements

See also
 Bridge (disambiguation).